Ismenia Villalba (Pampatar, Nueva Esparta, September 18, 1929 – Caracas, September 19, 2009), was a Venezuelan politician, wife of Jóvito Villalba. Ismenia Villalba served as deputy for Caracas and Nueva Esparta and was the first woman that participates in a Presidential Election in Venezuela, representing the Unión Republicana Democrática in the 1988 election. She won less than 1% of the vote.

See also 
Venezuela
Politics of Venezuela

References 

1929 births
2009 deaths
People from Nueva Esparta
Members of the Venezuelan Chamber of Deputies
Democratic Republican Union politicians
20th-century Venezuelan women politicians
20th-century Venezuelan politicians